Argentina competed at the 1968 Summer Olympics in Mexico City, Mexico. 89 competitors, 84 men and 5 women, took part in 61 events in 12 sports.

Medalists

Athletics

Men

Women

Boxing

Cycling

Nine cyclists represented Argentina in 1968.

Road race, time trial

Sprint

Pursuit

Equestrian

Eventing

Show jumping

Fencing

Ten fencers, nine men and one woman, represented Argentina in 1968.

Field hockey

Rowing

Sailing

Open

Shooting

Four shooters, all men, represented Argentina in 1968.

25 m pistol
 Oscar Cervo
 Nelson Torno

Trap
 Rodolfo Guarnieri
 Juan Ángel Martini, Jr.

Swimming

Weightlifting

Wrestling

References

Nations at the 1968 Summer Olympics
1968
1968 in Argentine sport